The U.S. state of South Dakota operates 13 state parks, 43 recreation areas, 6 nature areas, and 1 trail, totaling approximately 96,000 acres. These sites are administered by the South Dakota Department of Game, Fish, and Parks.

These areas preserve natural geologic features, historic and sacred Plains Indian sites, and historic pioneer settlements and forts. They also provide recreational facilities and access to waterbodies, including the Missouri River, on which there are 25 recreation areas.

South Dakota State Parks and recreation areas range in size from the 19-acre Sandy Shore Recreation Area to the 71,000-acre Custer State Park. It was the first park established in the system, in 1919. Good Earth State Park at Blood Run is the most recent park, added in 2013. System-wide visitation in 2016 was 7,500,000.

List of state parks and recreation areas

Proposed expansion 
The state is currently exploring establishing a new state park in Spearfish Canyon. The proposed Spearfish Canyon State Park would encompass 1,600-acres including Spearfish Falls, Roughlock Falls, and portions of Little Spearfish Canyon. The land is currently owned by the state of South Dakota and the federal government.

See also 
List of U.S. national parks

References

External links 
 South Dakota Game, Fish and Parks

State parks
 
South Dakota state parks